North Sea Germanic, also known as Ingvaeonic , is a postulated grouping of the northern West Germanic languages that consists of Old Frisian, Old English, and Old Saxon, and their descendants.

Ingvaeonic is named after the Ingaevones, a West Germanic cultural group or proto-tribe along the North Sea coast that was mentioned by both Tacitus and Pliny the Elder (the latter also mentioned that tribes in the group included the Cimbri, the Teutoni and the Chauci). It is thought of as not a monolithic proto-language but as a group of closely related dialects that underwent several areal changes in relative unison.

The grouping was first proposed in Nordgermanen und Alemannen (1942) by German linguist and philologist Friedrich Maurer as an alternative to the strict tree diagrams, which had become popular following the work of 19th-century linguist August Schleicher and assumed the existence of a special Anglo-Frisian group. The other groupings are Istvaeonic, from the Istvaeones, including Dutch, Afrikaans and related languages; and Irminonic, from the Irminones, including the High German languages.

Characteristics
Broadly speaking, the changes that characterise the Ingvaeonic languages can be divided into two groups, those being changes that occurred after the split from Proto-Northwest-Germanic (Ingvaeonic B) and those preceding it (Ingvaeonic A). Linguistic evidence for Ingvaeonic B observed in Old Frisian, Old English and Old Saxon is as follows:

The so-called Ingvaeonic nasal spirant law: converted *munþ "mouth" into *mų̄þ (compare Old English mūþ).
Loss of the third-person reflexive pronouns
The loss of person distinctions in plural forms of verbs, which reduced three forms into one form: merged *habjum "we have" and *habēþ "you (plural) have" with *habją̄þ "they have"
Palatalisation of velar consonants before front vowels; while the Anglo-Frisian languages further develop these palatal consonants into continuants like in church, Old Saxon did undergo palatalisation as evidenced by forms like kiennan "know" and kiesur "emperor" (contrast German kennen, Kaiser) as well as ieldan "pay," similar to English yield.
Only four unstressed vowels, those being /i~e/, /æ/, /ɑ/, and /o~u/, all of which are short, though only in Early Old English before the loss of unstressed /æ/
Lack of i-mutation in s/z-stem plurals; compare Anglian OE lombur "lambs" with OHG lembir
The development of Class III weak verbs into a relic class consisting of four verbs (*sagjan "to say", *hugjan "to think", *habjan "to have", *libjan "to live")
The split of the Class II weak verb ending *-ōn into *-ōjan: converted *makōn "to make" into *makōjan
Development of a plural ending *-ōs in a-stem nouns
Development of numerous new words, such as the replacement of *newun "nine" with *nigun and *minni "less" (adverb) with *laisi
Changes originating in Ingvaeonic A, like Old Norse but unlike Gothic and Old High German, include:

 Dative plurals and first person plural forms in numerous paradigms reduced to -um/-un. Compare an-stem dative plural han-ōm/ōn (OHG) and han-am (Gothic) with hǫn-um (ON), han-um/un (OS) and han-um (OE).
 Elimination of the weak stem -in- in n-stem noun paradigms. For example, OHG gen/dat. sg. han-en and Gothic han-in(s) versus OE han-an, OS han-an/on, OF hon-a, and ON han-a.
 Shortening of pronominal and adjectival non-feminine dative singulars like ON þeim, OE þǣm~þām, OF thām, and OS thēm, all of which have eliminated the final vowel; contrast Gothic þamma as well as OHG dëmu, dëmo, thëmu, thëmo and the like.

Several, but not all, characteristics are also found in Dutch, which did not generally undergo the nasal spirant law (except for a few words), retained the three distinct plural endings (only to merge them in a later, unrelated change), and exhibits the -s plural in only a limited number of words. However, it lost the reflexive pronoun (even though it did later regain it via borrowing) and had the same four relic weak verbs in Class III.

References

Further reading 
 Bremmer, Rolf H. (2009). An Introduction to Old Frisian. Amsterdam: John Benjamins B.V. .  
 Euler, Wolfram (2013). Das Westgermanische - von der Herausbildung im 3. bis zur Aufgliederung im 7. Jahrhundert - Analyse und Rekonstruktion (West Germanic: from its Emergence in the 3rd up until its Dissolution in the 7th Century CE: Analyses and Reconstruction). 244 p., in German with English summary, London/Berlin 2013, .
  Maurer, Friedrich (1942) Nordgermanen und Alemannen:  Studien zur germanischen und frühdeutschen Sprachgeschichte, Stammes- und Volkskunde, Strasbourg:  Hüneburg.  
 Ringe, Donald R. and Taylor, Ann (2014). The Development of Old English - A Linguistic History of English, vol. II, 632p. . Oxford.
  Sonderegger, Stefan (1979). Grundzüge deutscher Sprachgeschichte. Diachronie des Sprachsystems. Band I: Einführung – Genealogie – Konstanten. Berlin/New York: Walter de Gruyter. .
 Voyles, Joseph B. (1992). Early Germanic Grammar: Pre-, Proto-, and Post-Germanic. San Diego: Academic Press. .

 
1942 introductions
Archaeological terminology (Germanic)
Linguistic theories and hypotheses
West Germanic languages